This is a list of Italian television related events from 2015.

Events
14 May - 27-year-old manipulator dynamic Simone Al Ani wins the sixth season of Italia's Got Talent.
27 May - Fabio Curto wins the third season of The Voice of Italy.
10 December - Federica Lepanto wins the fourteenth season of Grande Fratello. Giosada wins the ninth season of X Factor on the same evening.

Debuts

RAI

Serials 

 Il paradiso delle signore (The ladies’ heaven) – soap opera (at first weekly, later daily) with Alessandro Tersigni and Alice Torrani, vaguely inspired by Émile Zola’s Au Bonheur des dames, whose plot is transposed in the Milan of the Italian economic miracle; 5 seasons (until now).

Sky

Serials 

 Alex & co. (Disney Channel) – sitcom about a music band of high school students, directed by Claudio Norza, with Leonardo Cecchi; 3 seasons, 4 special episodes, a film version (How to grow up despite your parents) and a spin-off (Penny on M. A. R.S.). First Italian fiction produced by Disney Channel, it gets a good public success and is widely exported in Europe and South America.

Television shows

RAI

Drama 

 Max e Helene – by Giacomo Battiato, with Alessandro Averone and Carolina Crescentini, from the Simon Wiesenthal’s novel, inspired by the true love story, at the time of the Holocaust, between a young Jew and the daughter of an anti-Semite.

Miniseries 

 La dama velata (The veiled lady) – gothic drama, by Carmine Elia, with Miriam Leone, Lino Guanciale and Lucrezia Lante Della Rovere, coproduced with Spain; 12 episodes. In the late nineteenth century, a woman fakes her own death to investigate about her family's mysteries.

Variety 

 Il decalogo di Vasco (Vasco Rossi’s Decalogue) – music documentary by Fabio Masi.

News and educational 
Missione spazio (Mission space) – by Marco Lorenzo Maiello; documentary about the space flights, with precious witnesses by the Italian astronauts. 
Tiziano Terzani una vita oltre le righe (Tiziano Terzani, an over the top life) – documentary-interview by Maurizio Bernardi.

2000s
Grande Fratello (2000–present)
Ballando con le stelle (2005–present)
X Factor (2008–present)

2010s
Italia's Got Talent (2010–present)
The Voice of Italy (2013–present)

Ending this year

Births

Deaths

See also
2015 in Italy
List of Italian films of 2015

References